The Complete Compendium of Universal Knowledge, Containing All You Want to Know of Language, History, Government, Business and Social Forms, and a Thousand and One Other Useful Subjects is an 1891 encyclopedia by William Ralston Balch. As its title suggests, it "sought to compile all knowledge of the universe into one digestible read". Topics covered were a 
smorgasbord of subjects including "how to cure stammering, how to clean and brighten our Brussels carpets, how to change our name and, of course, how to get rich... recipes ... and the fate of the apostles, how many Union Army troops died in the Civil War, and the cost of constructing a mile of railroad". It is described as "a mammoth undertaking that eventually led to a prototype for the first encyclopedias".

It was republished in 1895 and in the 20th century by Irv Teibel (Simulacrum Press), and in the 21st century (Palala Press and others).

Balch wrote other encyclopedias around the same time including The People's Dictionary and Every-day Encyclopedia in 1883 and Ready Reference: The Universal Cyclopaedia Containing Everything that Evertybody Wants to Know in 1901.

References

Sources

External links
 (full text of 1891 edition, public domain)

1891 non-fiction books
American encyclopedias
19th-century encyclopedias